Arnaud George Watson Massy (6 July 1877 – 16 April 1950) was one of France's most successful professional golfers, most notable for winning the 1907 Open Championship.

Early life
Massy was born in Biarritz, Pyrénées-Atlantiques, France. The son of a sheep farmer, he worked on a sardine boat and supplemented his income by caddying at the new Biarritz golf course where a great many of the best professional golfers from Britain came to practice during the off-season in the warm climate of southern France. Blessed with natural abilities, he learned from these pro golfers and in 1898 traveled to North Berwick, Scotland to develop his skills for a professional career.

Golf career
In 1906, Massy won the first edition of the French Open played at a Paris course. The following year he won it again, defeating a strong contingent of British players including the great Harry Vardon. But Massy wasn't through, he followed up his French national championship by becoming the first non-Briton to win The Open Championship (British Open). His victory raised the profile of the game in his native France, and with three other major players, he put on exhibition matches in various European cities that contributed significantly to the increased popularity of golf on the continent.

In 1910, Massy won the inaugural Belgian Open and in 1911 was the runner-up at the Open Championship to Harry Vardon. That year, Massy completed his book on golfing that was successfully published in France then translated into English for the British market. In 1912, he won the first Spanish Open ever played.

In 1913 he played in the France–United States Professional Match. In 1926 he won an exhibition match against Bobby Jones in France.

Massy's golfing career had to be put on hold as a result of World War I. While serving in the French army he was wounded at Verdun but at war's end was able to return to golfing. At age 41, he had lost four prime years and struggled to compete. Remarkably, in 1925 at age 48, he won the French Open for the fourth time and then won back-to-back Spanish Opens in 1927–28. When his career finally wound down he worked as a pro at courses in England, France and Morocco. Married to a British woman, Janet Henderson, originally from North Berwick, East Lothian, he lived in Edinburgh, Scotland, during the 1920s and early 1930s.

Death and legacy
Massy retired in Étretat, Seine-Maritime in Upper Normandy where he died in 1950 in poverty. He remains the only French golfer to ever have won any of the four men's major championships. He was also the only golfer from continental Europe to win a men's major championship before Seve Ballesteros won The Open Championship in 1979.

He is buried in Newington Cemetery in Edinburgh, where a new headstone was recently erected by the European Golf Association, Golf Collectors and The R&A. However shortly after the ceremony it was discovered that the actual burial site was located nearby in the cemetery. Despite this discrepancy, the headstone remains in its incorrect location. There is a plaque commemorating him fixed on the wall of the house he originally lived in North Berwick, East Lothian, in Forth Street there.

Tournament wins
Note: This list may be incomplete.
1906 French Open
1907 Grand Duke Michael's Tournament, The Open Championship, French Open
1908 Blackpool Professional Tournament (England), Turnberry Professional Tournament (Scotland)
1909 Pitlochry Professional Tournament (Scotland)
1910 Belgian Open
1911 French Open
1912 Spanish Open
1919 Inter-Allied Games
1921 Tooting Bec Cup
1925 French Open, Omnium National (France)
1926 Omnium National (France)
1927 Spanish Open
1928 Spanish Open

Major championships

Wins (1)

Results timeline

Note: Massy only played in The Open Championship

WD = Withdrew
NT = No tournament
CUT = missed the half-way cut
"T" indicates a tie for a place

Team appearances
Coronation Match (representing the Professionals): 1911 (winners)
France–United States Professional Match (representing France): 1913 (winners)
Inter-Allied Games (representing France): 1919 (winners)
France–Great Britain Professional Match (representing France): 1929

References

Adapted from the article Arnaud Massy, from Wikinfo, licensed under the GNU Free Documentation License.

French male golfers
Winners of men's major golf championships
Sportspeople from Biarritz
1877 births
1950 deaths